Eda Tuğsuz (born 27 March 1997) is a Turkish track and field athlete who competes in the javelin throw.

She competed in the javelin throw at the 2016 European Championships in Amsterdam, Netherlands. In 2013, she won at the European Youth Summer Olympic Festival. Tuğsuz holds Turkish record with a throw of 67.21 m. She won the bronze medal at the 2019 Summer Universiade held in Naples, Italy.

Personal bests

International competitions

References

External links 
 

1997 births
Living people
Turkish female javelin throwers
Athletes (track and field) at the 2014 Summer Youth Olympics
Sportspeople from Antalya
European Games competitors for Turkey
Athletes (track and field) at the 2019 European Games
Universiade medalists in athletics (track and field)
Universiade bronze medalists for Turkey
Medalists at the 2019 Summer Universiade
Islamic Solidarity Games competitors for Turkey
Athletes (track and field) at the 2020 Summer Olympics
Olympic athletes of Turkey
Olympic female javelin throwers
Athletes (track and field) at the 2022 Mediterranean Games
Mediterranean Games medalists in athletics
Mediterranean Games silver medalists for Turkey
Islamic Solidarity Games medalists in athletics
21st-century Turkish women